HMS Poppy was a  that served in the Royal Navy as a convoy escort during World War II.

Design and construction
The Flower class arose as a result of the Royal Navy's realisation in the late 1930s that it had a shortage of escort vessels, particularly coastal escorts for use on the East coast of Britain, as the likelihood of war with Germany increased. To meet this urgent requirement, a design developed based on the whale-catcher  - this design was much more capable than naval trawlers, but cheaper and quicker to build than the s or  sloops that were alternatives for the coastal escort role.

Displacement was about  standard and  full load.

Poppy was one of six Flowers ordered on 3 August 1940. The ship was laid down on 6 March 1941, by Alexander Hall & Co., Ltd., at their Aberdeen, Scotland shipyard. She was launched on 20 November 1941, and commissioned on 12 May 1942.

Service history

On 27 June 1942, Poppy departed Reykjavik, Iceland, escorting convoy PQ-17, bound for Arkhangelsk, Russia. On 4 July 1942, the Admiralty ordered the convoy to disperse.

Poppy escorted 51 convoys during the war, along with anti-submarine exercises with Royal Navy submarines off of Lough Foyle, and once each off Derry and Campbeltown.

Citations

References

Further reading
 

 

Flower-class corvettes of the Royal Navy
1940 ships
Ships built in Aberdeen
Ships built by Alexander Hall and Sons